The 1996 NCAA Division I Outdoor Track and Field Championships were contested May 29−June 1 at Hayward Field at the University of Oregon in Eugene, Oregon in order to determine the individual and team national champions of men's and women's collegiate Division I outdoor track and field events in the United States. 

These were the 74th annual men's championships and the 15th annual women's championships. This was the Ducks' eighth time hosting the event and the first since 1991.

In a repeat of the previous four years' results, Arkansas and LSU topped the men's and women's team standings, respectively; it was the Razorbacks' sixth men's team title and the tenth for the Lady Tigers. This was the fifth of eight consecutive titles for Arkansas. The Lady Tigers, meanwhile, won their tenth consecutive title and, ultimately, the tenth of eleven consecutive titles they won between 1987 and 1997.

Team results 
 Note: Top 10 only
 (H) = Hosts
Full results

Men's standings

Women's standings

References

NCAA Men's Outdoor Track and Field Championship
NCAA Division I Outdoor Track and Field Championships
NCAA
NCAA Division I Outdoor Track and Field Championships
NCAA Division I Outdoor Track and Field Championships
NCAA Women's Outdoor Track and Field Championship